Frederick M. "Crazy" Schmit  (February 13, 1866 – October 5, 1940) was a pitcher in Major League Baseball. He played for the Pittsburgh Alleghenys, Baltimore Orioles, New York Giants, Cleveland Spiders, and Baltimore Orioles.  At the time of the 1910 United States Census, Schmit was living in Chicago with his wife Mary and their three children, Dorothy, Karl, and Frederick.  Schmit's occupation was still listed as a "Professional Baseball player."  In October 1940, he died of a heart attack and a cerebral hemorrhage at his home in Forest Glen section of Chicago.

References

External links

1866 births
1960 deaths
Major League Baseball pitchers
Pittsburgh Alleghenys players
Baltimore Orioles (NL) players
New York Giants (NL) players
Cleveland Spiders players
Baltimore Orioles (1901–02) players
19th-century baseball players
Baseball players from Chicago
Kalamazoo Kazoos players
Flint Flyers players
St. Paul Apostles players
Davenport Pilgrims players
Aurora Maroons players
Evansville Hoosiers players
Duluth Whalebacks players
Macon Central City players
Mobile Blackbirds players
Memphis Giants players
Troy Trojans (minor league) players
Grand Rapids Rippers players
Austin Beavers players
San Antonio Missionaries players
Atlanta Crackers players
Memphis Lambs players
New Bedford Whalers (baseball) players
New Bedford Browns players
Norfolk Braves players
Petersburg Farmers players
Hampton Clamdiggers players
Portsmouth Browns players
Columbus Senators players
Anderson Anders players
Oswego Pioneers players